Wickham Bishops railway station served the village of Wickham Bishops, Essex. The line and station closed to passenger services in 1964 though goods traffic continued for a further two years.

History
Passenger services began on 2 October that year, and a station originally named Wickham was opened that day.

The station was renamed Wickham Bishops on 1 October 1913. It, and the rest of the line, closed on 7 September 1964. The main station building is now a private house.

References

External links
 Wickham Bishops station on navigable 1945 O. S. map

Disused railway stations in Essex
Former Great Eastern Railway stations
Railway stations in Great Britain opened in 1848
Railway stations in Great Britain closed in 1964
Beeching closures in England
1848 establishments in England
1964 disestablishments in England